Matteo Rossi (born 11 July 1975 in Genoa) is an Italian retired footballer. He played as a defender. He played from 1982 for Genoa youth teams. He made his debut in Serie A on 15 April 1995 with Genoa against Cagliari. He played for 67 minutes before being replaced by Kazuyoshi Miura. On 21 May, he played his second Serie A match against Foggia and his team won 3–0. At the end of the season Genoa was relegated in Serie B, where he played one match. He continued his career in lower series.

References

1965 births
Living people
Footballers from Genoa
Genoa C.F.C. players
Spezia Calcio players
F.S. Sestrese Calcio 1919 players
Association football defenders
Italian footballers